This article is a list of the U.S. states, with population, murders and non-negligent manslaughter, murders, gun murders, and gun ownership percentage, then calculated rates per 100,000. The population data is from the U.S. Census Bureau. Murder rates were calculated based on the FBI Uniform Crime Reports and the estimated census population of each state.

The 2015 U.S. population total was 320.9 million. The 2015 U.S. overall murder and non-negligent manslaughter rate per 100,000 inhabitants was 4.9.

The 2019 U.S. population total was 328.2 million. The 2019 U.S. overall murder and non-negligent manslaughter rate per 100,000 inhabitants was 5.0.

2015 data

2019 data

See also
 Crime in the United States
 Gun laws in the United States by state
 Gun violence in the United States
 United States Peace Index
 List of U.S. states and territories by violent crime rate
 List of U.S. states and territories by intentional homicide rate
 Firearm death rates in the United States by state

Sources

Gun violence